Scopula traducta is a moth of the  family Geometridae. It is found in Burma.

References

Moths described in 1938
traducta
Moths of Asia